Josef Peters (September 16, 1914 – April 24, 2001) was a racing driver from Düsseldorf, Germany.  He participated in one Formula One World Championship Grand Prix, on August 3, 1952.  He failed to finish, scoring no championship points.

Complete Formula One World Championship results
(key)

References

1914 births
2001 deaths
German racing drivers
German Formula One drivers
Sportspeople from Düsseldorf
Racing drivers from North Rhine-Westphalia